is a Fung Shui practitioner from Hong Kong.

Early life 
In 1968, Lee was born as Lee Siu Tong. At 16 years old, Lee's father changed his name from Lee Siu Tong (李紹唐) to Lee Shing Chak (李丞責).
Three generations from his family are involved in geomancy.

Career 
Starting from seven or eight years old, he learned Fung Shui from his father, and finally become a Fung Shui specialist when he was 19 years old. He combines the ancient art of feng shui with the modern practice of statistics to divine what the future holds.

Personal life 
On February 4, 2007, Lee married Tam Pui Lai after 13 years of relationship. Many celebrities are invited to attend the wedding ceremony. However, in April 2011, Lee divorced Tam Pui Lai. In the same year, he and artist Sandy Lau fell in love when shooting TV program "Hong Kong Mystery Case". On January 24, 2012, Sandy Lau's birthday, he proposed successfully and they are engaged. Their daughter was born on March 19, 2016.

Books

Filmography

Radio Program 
新城電台：
靈舍八卦
香港電台：
瘋show快活人

TV Program 
有線電視：
玄機解碼
怪談
無綫電視：
香港玄案
新春開運王
我愛香港

Film 
香港第一凶宅
豪情 飾 Mike
行運秘笈

References 

李丞責：一技傍身食唔盡，2011年1月9日，蘋果日報]

External links 

1968 births
Living people